The West India Docks are a series of three docks, quaysides and warehouses built to import goods from and export goods and occasionally passengers to the British West Indies on the Isle of Dogs in London the first of which opened in 1802. Following their commercial closure in 1980, the Canary Wharf development was built around the wet docks by narrowing some of their broadest tracts.

History

Early history
Robert Milligan, of a Scottish family, (–1809) was largely responsible for the construction of the West India Docks. He was a wealthy West Indies merchant, slave trader and ship owner, who returned to London having managed his family's Jamaica sugar plantations. Outraged at losses due to theft and delay at London's riverside wharves, Milligan headed a group of powerful businessmen, including the chairman of the London Society of West India Planters and Merchants, George Hibbert, a merchant, politician, and ship-owner, who promoted the creation of a wet dock circled by a high wall. The group planned and built West India Docks, lobbying Parliament to allow the creation of a West India Dock Company. Milligan served as both deputy chairman and chairman of the West India Dock Company. The docks were authorised by the West India Dock Act 1799.

The docks were constructed in two phases. The two northern docks were constructed between 1800 and 1802 for the West India Dock Company to a design by leading civil engineer William Jessop (John Rennie was a consultant, and Thomas Morris, Liverpool's third dock engineer, was also involved; Ralph Walker was appointed resident engineer), and were the first commercial wet docks in London. British Prime Minister William Pitt the Younger and Lord Chancellor Lord Loughborough were assisted in the foundation stone ceremony on 12 July 1800 by Milligan and Hibbert. The docks were formally opened on 27 August 1802 when the unladen  was hauled in by ropes. Echo, a ship laden with cargo from the West Indies, followed. For the following 21 years all vessels in the West India trade using the Port of London were compelled to use the West India docks by a clause in the Act of Parliament that had enabled their construction.

The southern dock, the South West India Dock, later known as South Dock, was constructed in the 1860s, replacing the unprofitable City Canal, built in 1805. In 1909 the Port of London Authority (PLA) took over the West India Docks, along with the other enclosed docks from St Katharines to Tilbury.

From 1960 to 1980, trade in the docks declined to almost nothing. There were two main reasons. First, the development of the shipping container made this type of relatively small dock inefficient, and the dock-owners were slow to embrace change. Second, the manufacturing exports which had maintained the trade through the docks dwindled and moved away from the local area. The docks were closed in 1981.

Re-development
After the closure of the upstream enclosed docks, the area was regenerated as part of the Docklands scheme, and is now home to the developments of Canary Wharf. The early phase one buildings of Canary Wharf were built out over the water, reducing the width of the north dock and middle dock. Canary Wharf tube station was constructed within the middle dock in the 1990s. Part of the original dock building was converted for use as the Museum of London Docklands in 2003.

The Crossrail Place development was completed in May 2015 and the Canary Wharf Crossrail station below it was completed in September 2015.

Layout
Between them, the docks had a combined capability to berth over 600 vessels. Locks and basins at either end of the Docks connected them to the river Thames. These were known as Blackwall Basin and Limehouse Basin, not to be confused with the Regent's Canal Dock also known as Limehouse Basin. To avoid congestion, ships entered from the (eastern) Blackwall end; lighters entered from the Limehouse end to the west. A dry dock for ship repairs was constructed connecting to Blackwall Basin. Subsequently, the North London Railway's Poplar Dock was also connected to Blackwall Basin.

The Docks' design allowed a ship arriving from the West Indies to unload in the northern dock, sail round to the southern dock and load up with export cargo in a fraction of the time it had previously taken in the heavily congested and dangerous upper reaches of the Thames. Around the Import Dock a continuous line of five-storey warehouses was constructed, designed by architect George Gwilt and his son, also named George. The Export Dock needed fewer buildings as cargo was loaded upon arrival.

The three docks were initially separate, with the two northern docks interconnected only via the basin at each end, and South Dock connected via a series of three basins at the eastern end. Railway access was very difficult. Under PLA control, cuts were made to connect the three docks into a single system, and the connections to the Thames at the western end were filled, along with the Limehouse basin and with it the western connection between the two northern docks. This allowed improved road and rail access from the north and west. South Dock was also connected to the north end of Millwall Dock, its enlarged eastern lock becoming the only entrance from the Thames to the whole West India and Millwall system.

See also
British West Indies

Notes and references

Notes

References

History of the London Borough of Tower Hamlets
London docks
Buildings and structures in the London Borough of Tower Hamlets
Port of London